Quick Off The Mark Productions was a film & television production company operating in Glasgow, Scotland from 9 October 2009 to 7 June 2016. It was possibly best known for the films In Search of La Che and The Greyness of Autumn.

History

Quick Off The Mark Productions was formed on 9 October 2009 by Mark D. Ferguson and Chris Quick. Its first main project was Butter Side Down a claymation series about a mans campaign to save the traditional light bulb from extinction. In 2010 work began on their first feature film In Search of La Che, a mockumentary which followed John Tavish (Played by Duncan Airlie James) and his quest to track down fictional rock star Roxy La Che. The film premiered at the Glasgow Film Theatre on 9 November 2011 and was later selected to appear at the 2014 American Online Film Awards. In 2013, the company made the headlines on CNN following the death of Margaret Thatcher. The news channel, which was discussing portrayals of the former Prime Minister in film, spoke of Steve Nallon's performance from In Search Of La Che, in which Thatcher plays a part in the life story of fictional rock star, Roxy La Che.

The company was involved in the filming of a wide variety of live kickboxing, wrestling and MMA shows in and around Glasgow. In particular, Quick Off The Mark Productions was responsible for the coverage of every show of the Katana Fighting Series which was run by Duncan Airlie James. The shows which ran from 2010 to 2013 were often refereed by John Blackledge and attracted guest appearances from former fighters including Ernesto Hoost.

In 2012, the company produced a behind the scenes documentary in association with the Burns Museum in Ayr about the services run by the local charity Recovery Ayr and its upcoming custom pantomime Tam O'Shanter: The Mornin Eftir. In the same year, Quick Off The Mark Productions released the short film The Greyness of Autumn which went on to feature in a number of festivals including the Portobello Film Festival in London and the People of Passion Film Festival in Australia where the film picked up the Best Short Comedy accolade. In 2014, the company, in association with Futurist Film Ltd produced the short family film Minion Vs Minion for Vue Cinemas.

On 12 December 2014 the company's website confirmed that writing had begun on a possible sequel to The Greyness of Autumn entitled Autumn Never Dies. A crowd funding campaign was launched on Kickstarter on 17 August 2015 to raise funds for the production and lasted for 30 days. The campaign successfully raised £1,505 from 44 backers including former Gamesmaster host Dominik Diamond.

Closure

On 14 October 2015, Quick Off The Mark Productions announced that director Mark D. Ferguson was moving to Canada and that the company would be disbanded in the new year. Filming responsibilities for Autumn Never Dies were handed over to Pentagram Productions UK and Suited Caribou Media. After 6 years, 4 months and 10 days, the company ceased trading on 19 February 2016 and was formally dissolved by Companies House on 7 June 2016. The company's logo was changed on the final day to the running man relaxing in a chair with a glass of wine with his film reel lying on the floor. Underneath the logo it read:

Filmography

Awards

Other Productions

See also 
Mark D. Ferguson
Chris Quick
In Search of La Che
The Greyness of Autumn

External links
Quick Off The Mark Productions Website
Company IMDB Profile

References

Defunct mass media companies of the United Kingdom
Film production companies of the United Kingdom
Television production companies of the United Kingdom
Defunct companies of Scotland
Companies based in Glasgow
Mass media companies established in 2009
Mass media companies disestablished in 2016
2009 establishments in Scotland
2016 disestablishments in Scotland
British companies disestablished in 2016
British companies established in 2009